"How Do You Do!"  is a pop rock song by Swedish pop duo Roxette. It was released as the lead single from their fourth studio album Tourism on 3 July 1992. The track was a commercial success upon release, topping the national singles charts in Norway and Spain. It also peaked at number two in several countries, including Austria, Belgium, Finland, Germany, the Netherlands, Sweden and Switzerland. It was held off the top spot in many of these territories by Dr. Alban's "It's My Life". The single was backed by several remixes created by Swedish production duo BomKrash, which consisted of Jacob Hellner and Carl-Michael Herlöfsson.

Composition and style
According to Ultimate Guitar, "How Do You Do!" is an uptempo pop rock song written in common time with a tempo of 121 beats per minute. It utilises a common trait found in Roxette compositions of the verse using a different key signature than the chorus. The verse is composed in C, and consists of three repetitions of a basic C–F–G–F sequence, followed by one shortened sequence of C–F–G. The pre-chorus makes use of a power chord structure, and consists of a sequence of Am–G–F–C–Em, which is then amended to Am–G–F–G. Following a brief pause, Marie Fredriksson takes over lead vocals for the song's chorus, which moves up from the verses by two keys to E♭. The chorus is composed almost entirely of sharp notes, and follows a sequence of D♯–A♯–D♯–G♯–A♯–Cm–G♯–A♯–Cm–G♯–A♯. The bridge consists of four short repetitions of Cm–A♯, played as power chords. The last chorus and outro are in F, following the transposed sequence F-C-F-B♭-C-Dm-B♭-C-Dm-B♭-C. American musician Tiny Tim is referenced in the song's lyrics.

Critical reception
In his review of Tourism, AllMusic editor Bryan Buss wrote that "How Do You Do!" is a "perfectly presented pop ditty, bright and sunny as summer". Larry Flick from Billboard described the song as a "peppy, guitar-anchored pop/rocker." He noted that "bopping pogo beats and Per Gessle's highly attitudinal lead vocal are strongest points in luring radio programmers." Gavin Report called it a "fun track" that "starts off with a froggy-voiced Per Gessle posing the most asked question in the English language."

Formats and track listings
 Cassette and 7-inch single (Europe 8650027)
 "How Do You Do!" – 3:09
 "Fading Like a Flower (Every Time You Leave)" (live from the Sydney Entertainment Centre on 13 December 1991) – 4:09

 12-inch single (Europe 8650026)
 "How Do You Do!" (7-inch version) – 3:12
 "Knockin' on Every Door" (BomKrash 7-inch remix) – 3:51
 "How Do You Do!" (BomKrash 12-inch remix) – 5:43

 CD single (Europe and Australia 8650022 · UK CDEM-241)
 "How Do You Do!" (7-inch version) – 3:12
 "Fading Like a Flower (Every Time You Leave)" (live from Sydney) – 4:09
 "Knockin' on Every Door" (BomKrash 12-inch remix) – 6:05
 "How Do You Do!" (BomKrash 12-inch remix) – 5:43

 US CD single (E2-56252)
 "How Do You Do!" (7-inch version) – 3:12
 "How Do You Do!" (BomKrash US edit) – 3:11
 "Fading Like a Flower (Every Time You Leave)" (live from Sydney) – 4:09

Credits and personnel
Credits are adapted from the liner notes of The Rox Box/Roxette 86–06.

Studios
 Recorded between April and May 1992 at Tits & Ass Studio (Halmstad, Sweden) and EMI Studios (Stockholm, Sweden)
 Mixed at EMI Studios (Stockholm, Sweden)

Musicians
 Marie Fredriksson – lead and background vocals
 Per Gessle – lead and background vocals, mixing
 Per "Pelle" Alsing – drums
 Vicki Benckert – background vocals
 Anders Herrlin – bass guitar, programming and engineering 
 Jonas Isacsson – electric guitars
 Clarence Öfwerman – keyboards and production, mixing
 Staffan Öfwerman – percussion and background vocals
 Mats "M.P." Persson – engineering 
 Alar Suurna – mixing, engineering

Charts

Weekly charts

Year-end charts

Certifications

Release history

Cascada version

In 2005, a cover of the song by German dance act Cascada was released as the third single from their debut album Everytime We Touch. This version charted in the top fifty of the Ö3 Austria Top 40, but failed to chart elsewhere.

Formats and track listings
CD maxi
 "How Do You Do!" (Radio Edit) – 3:16
 "How Do You Do!" (Pop Airplay Edit) – 2:51
 "How Do You Do!" (Album Version) – 3:29
 "How Do You Do!" (Original Club Mix) – 5:05
 "How Do You Do!" (Rob Mayth Remix) – 5:31
 "How Do You Do!" (Megara vs. DJ Lee Remix) – 7:05
 "How Do You Do!" (Tune up! Remix) – 5:30
 "How Do You Do!" (Veranos Fuzzy Styled Remix) – 6:00
 "How Do You Do!" (EXR Reconstruction) – 5:57

Digital download
 "How Do You Do!" (Radio Edit) – 3:16
 "How Do You Do!" (Rob Mayth Radio Edit) – 3:55
 "How Do You Do!" (Original Mix) – 5:04
 "How Do You Do!" (Megara vs. DJ Lee Remix) – 7:05

References

External links
 Roxette.se — Roxette's official website
 CascadaMusic.de — Cascada's official website

Roxette songs
1992 singles
1992 songs
EMI Records singles
Number-one singles in Norway
Number-one singles in Spain
Songs written by Per Gessle